Stanisław Haller de Hallenburg (26 April 1872 – April 1940) was a Polish politician and general who was murdered in the Katyn massacre. He was a cousin of General Józef Haller von Hallenburg.

Life
Between 1894 and 1918 Haller served in the Austro-Hungarian Army.  Among other military functions, he was commandant of Fortress Kraków.
In 1918 he joined the renascent Polish Army.  During the Polish-Soviet War he contributed to the defeat of Budionny's army and its expulsion beyond the Bug River.  In 1919-1920, 1923–25 and in May 1926 he was Chief of the Polish General Staff.  After 1926 he was placed in retirement as a political opponent of the new regime headed by Józef Piłsudski.

Katyn
In 1939 he was arrested by the Soviets and placed in a POW camp in Starobielsk.  Along with other Polish POWs, he was murdered by the NKVD in April 1940, just before his sixty-eighth birthday, near Kharkov, in the Katyn Massacres. 

Among the Katyn victims were 14 Polish military leaders, including Leon Billewicz, Bronisław Bohatyrewicz, Xawery Czernicki, Henryk Minkiewicz, Kazimierz Orlik-Łukoski, Konstanty Plisowski, Rudolf Prich (murdered in Lwow), Franciszek Sikorski, Leonard Skierski, Piotr Skuratowicz, Mieczysław Smorawiński, and Alojzy Wir-Konas (promoted posthumously). 

Stanisław Haller is patron of the 5th command regiment of the Kraków-based Polish 2nd Mechanized Corps.

Honours and awards
 Commander's Cross of the Order of Virtuti Militari; previously awarded the Silver Cross (1921)
 Commander's Cross of the Order of Polonia Restituta
 Cross of Valour - twice
 Cross of Liberty, Class I (Estonia)
 Royal Order of St. Stephen of Hungary
 Order of St. Stanislaus

See also
Prometheism
List of Poles

References

This article may be expanded with text translated from the corresponding article in the Polish Wikipedia

Bibliography
 
 

1872 births
1940 deaths
People from Skawina
People from the Kingdom of Galicia and Lodomeria
Polish people of German descent
Polish generals
Polish politicians
Austro-Hungarian military personnel of World War I
Polish people of the Polish–Soviet War
People of the Polish May Coup (pro-government side)
Commanders of the Virtuti Militari
Commanders of the Order of Polonia Restituta
Recipients of the Cross of Valour (Poland)
Recipients of the Order of Saint Stephen of Hungary
Katyn massacre victims
Polish military personnel killed in World War II